Jaghin-e Jonubi Rural District is a rural district (dehestan) in the Jaghin District of Rudan County, Hormozgan Province, Iran. At the 2006 census, its population was 4,083, in 847 families.  The rural district has 7 villages.

References 

Rural Districts of Hormozgan Province
Rudan County